Ballaghbeddy is a townland of 164 acres in County Antrim, Northern Ireland, near Ballymoney. It is situated in the historic barony of Kilconway and the civil parish of Finvoy, on the eastern bank of the River Bann which forms the western boundary of the parish of Finvoy.

19th century population
The population of the townland decreased during the 19th century:

See also 
List of townlands in County Antrim

References

Townlands of County Antrim
Civil parish of Finvoy